Jacques Georges Lambert (14 January 1891 – 4 January 1948) was a French architect. At the art competitions of the 1928 Olympic Games he won a silver medal in town planning and a bronze medal in architectural design both for his "The Versailles Stadium".

References

External links
Jacques Lambert's profile at databaseOlympics
Jacques Lambert's biography at AGORHA 

1891 births
1948 deaths
20th-century French architects
Olympic silver medalists in art competitions
Olympic bronze medalists in art competitions
Medalists at the 1928 Summer Olympics
Olympic competitors in art competitions